Nguyễn Quốc Long (born 19 February 1988) is a Vietnamese retired professional footballer who played as a right back.

Nguyễn Quốc Long began his career at Thể Công. He then spent most of his career with mixed successes at Hanoi FC and Saigon FC.

References

1988 births
Living people
Vietnamese footballers
Association football defenders
V.League 1 players
Hanoi FC players
Saigon FC players
Vietnam international footballers
Footballers at the 2010 Asian Games
Sportspeople from Hanoi
Viettel FC players
Asian Games competitors for Vietnam
21st-century Vietnamese people